{{Taxobox
| image = 
| image_caption = 
| regnum = Animalia
| phylum = Arthropoda
| classis = Insecta
| ordo = Lepidoptera
| familia = Pyralidae
| genus = Hypsotropa
| species = H. atakorella
| binomial = Hypsotropa atakorella| binomial_authority = (Marion, 1957)
| synonyms = *Heosphora atakorella Marion, 1957
}}Hypsotropa atakorella is a species of snout moth in the genus Hypsotropa''. It was described by Hubert Marion in 1957 and is known from west Africa.

References

Moths described in 1957
Anerastiini